View from the House is the eleventh studio album by American singer-songwriter Kim Carnes. It was released on July 25, 1988 by MCA Records. The album marked a return to her early country music roots. Carnes recorded the album in Nashville, Tennessee, and co-produced the album with Jimmy Bowen.

View from the House received positive reviews, with music critics praising Carnes's cover songs. The album reached number 39 on the Billboard Top Country Albums chart, and contained two hit singles. "Crazy in Love" and "Speed of the Sound of Loneliness" both charted on the Billboard Hot Country Singles & Tracks at number 68 and number 70 respectively. "Crazy in Love" also reached number 13 on the Adult Contemporary chart.

Background
Prior to making the album, Carnes stated, "I can't do another album here (in Los Angeles). I've tried and finally stopped. The only way I get a thrill out of recording is to record live as opposed to running everything through a computer. I want to feel that interplay between musicians. And I feel real strongly that Nashville is the place to make an album with real instruments."

Carnes had been interested in the Nashville music scene since 1981, after hearing Rosanne Cash's album Seven Year Ache. Carnes wanted to work with Jimmy Bowen, who produced her debut album, Rest on Me, in 1971.

Carnes chose to record a cover of "If You Don't Want My Love" by John Prine. The head of A&R at MCA suggested to Carnes that she also record Prine's song "Speed of the Sound of Loneliness". "Who thinks of that?" Carnes said. "The speed of the sound of loneliness? Lyrically, that blew me away."

Carnes wrote "Blood from the Bandit", with Donna Weiss, as a reflection on "pollution, greed, and other conditions afflicting the world". "The song is still pertinent today, more so, maybe," Carnes said in 2017. "What was being talked about then is on steroids now."

Critical reception

Ralph Novak of People magazine stated that Carnes sounds "Wonderfully relaxed and justifiably pleased with herself", noting the album's ten "generally splendid tunes" including the "convincingly romantic" cover of "Crazy in Love". AllMusic retrospectively described the album as "[a return] to the folk and country music of her earlier years." In the Honolulu Advertiser, Mike Cidoni described View from the House as a "grown-up departure from [her] techno-pop style of the early 80s". Hugh Wyatt of the New York Daily News likened Carnes' vocal performance on "Just to Spend Tonight with You" to that of Bob Dylan. He described her voice as "intoxicating" and highlighted "Blood from the Bandit" as a "brilliant, insightful tune about greed".

Promotion

Singles
Four singles were released from View from the House. The first US single was "Speed of the Sound of Loneliness", which charted at number 70 on the Billboard Hot Country Songs chart. The second single, "Crazy in Love", first recorded by Joe Cocker in 1984, reached number 68 on the Billboard Hot Country Songs chart, and reached number 13 on the Billboard Adult Contemporary chart. The third single, "Just to Spend Tonight with You", was released in the United Kingdom, though did not chart. The fourth single, "Fantastic Fire of Love", was released in 1989.

Track listing

Personnel 
 Kim Carnes – lead and backing vocals, synthesizers (1)
 John Barlow Jarvis – acoustic piano (1-9), synthesizers (1-9)
 Bill Cuomo – synthesizers (10), drum programming (10)
 Bruce Hornsby – accordion (1)
 John Cascella – accordion (2, 3, 7)
 Craig Hull – electric guitar, slide guitar 
 Josh Leo – electric guitar 
 Billy Joe Walker, Jr. – electric guitar, acoustic guitar 
 Mark O'Connor – mandolin, mandola, fiddle
 Leland Sklar – bass
 Craig Krampf – drums, percussion, washboard (3)
 Kirk "Jellyroll" Johnson – harmonica
 Vince Gill – harmony vocals (3)
 Steve Wariner – harmony vocals (5)
 Dave Ellingson – harmony vocals (6, 9)
 Lyle Lovett – harmony vocals (7)

Technical Credits
 Bob Bullock – recording engineer, overdub recording, mixing 
 Bill Cuomo – recording engineer (10)
 Spence Chrislu – second engineer
 Mark J. Coddington – second engineer
 Russ Martin – second engineer, overdub recording 
 Bob Vogt – second engineer
 Bill Dooley – additional engineer
 Richard Bosworth – additional overdub recording
 Chuck Ainlay – mixing 
 Niko Bolas – mixing 
 Jimmy Bowen – mixing 
 George Marino – mastering 
 A&M Studios, Hollywood, California – mixing location 
 Masterfonics, Nashville, Tennessee –mixing location
 Sound Stage Studios, Nashville, Tennessee –mixing location
 Sterling Sound, New York City, New York – mastering location

Production Credits
 Sue McGonigle – production assistant 
 Jessie Noble – project coordinator 
 Simon Levy – art direction 
 Jerry Joyner – design 
 Peter Nash – photography

Charts

References

1988 albums
Kim Carnes albums
Albums produced by Jimmy Bowen
MCA Records albums